The 1950 Colorado gubernatorial election was held on November 7, 1950. Republican nominee Daniel I. J. Thornton defeated Democratic incumbent Walter Walford Johnson with 52.43% of the vote.

Primary elections
Primary elections were held on September 12, 1950.

Democratic primary

Candidates
Walter Walford Johnson, incumbent Governor

Results

Republican primary

Candidates
Daniel I. J. Thornton
Ray H. Brannaman

Results

General election

Candidates
Major party candidates
Daniel I. J. Thornton, Republican
Walter Walford Johnson, Democratic

Other candidates
Louis K. Stephens, Socialist Labor

Results

References

1950
Colorado
Gubernatorial
November 1950 events in the United States